Lyubov Klochko or Liubov Klochko (born 26 September 1959) is a retired female long-distance runner from Ukraine. She set her personal best (2:28:47) in the women's marathon in 1988.

Achievements

References

1959 births
Living people
Ukrainian female long-distance runners
Ukrainian female marathon runners
Soviet female long-distance runners
Soviet female marathon runners
Olympic female marathon runners
Olympic athletes of Ukraine
Athletes (track and field) at the 1996 Summer Olympics
Japan Championships in Athletics winners